Bicyclus simulacris is a butterfly in the family Nymphalidae. It is found in Tanzania, Malawi and Zambia. The habitat consists of montane forests.

Subspecies
Bicyclus simulacris simulacris (eastern and southern Tanzania, Malawi, Zambia)
Bicyclus simulacris septentrionalis Kielland, 1990 (north-eastern Tanzania)

References

Elymniini
Butterflies described in 1990